Me and Mr. Ray is the second full-length album by Miracle Legion, and the last recorded on the Rough Trade Records label, released in 1989.

Release
Released on vinyl, CD, and cassette, the 10 song LP Me and Mr. Ray was released under Rough Trade Records in 1989. The songs were composed by Mark Mulcahy and Ray Neal.

Track listing
All songs written by Mark Mulcahy and Ray Neal

Personnel
Mark Mulcahy - vocals
Ray Neal - guitar

References

1989 albums
Miracle Legion albums
Rough Trade Records albums